Zinc finger protein 665 is a protein that in humans is encoded by the ZNF665 gene.

References

Further reading